The 1947 All-Ireland Minor Football Championship was the 16th staging of the All-Ireland Minor Football Championship, the Gaelic Athletic Association's premier inter-county Gaelic football tournament for boys under the age of 18.

Kerry entered the championship as defending champions, however, they were defeated in the All-Ireland semi-final

On 14 September 1947, Tyrone won the championship following a 4-4 to 4-3 defeat of Mayo in the All-Ireland final. This was their first All-Ireland title.

Results

Connacht Minor Football Championship

Leinster Minor Football Championship

Munster Minor Football Championship

Ulster Minor Football Championship

All-Ireland Minor Football Championship
Semi-Finals

Final

Championship statistics

Miscellaneous

 Offaly win the Leinster title for the first time in their history.

References

1947
All-Ireland Minor Football Championship